Brownsboro is an unincorporated community in Madison County, Alabama, United States.  The Flint River (Alabama) passes through the town and floods periodically.

History
Brownsboro is named after a local miller, John Brown. A post office was established at Brownsboro in 1824.

Notable person
John Stallworth, professional football player, 4 time Super Bowl champion (IX, X, XIII, XIV).

References

Unincorporated communities in Alabama
Unincorporated communities in Madison County, Alabama
Huntsville-Decatur, AL Combined Statistical Area